Northern Lights is the debut studio album produced by electronic dance music artist Gareth Emery, released on September 28, 2010.

Track listing

Northern Lights Re-Lit
Northern Lights Re-Lit (2011) - remixes album, released March 9, 2011 in UK on GARUDA and March 18, 2011 in US on label Napith Music. Re-released in UK on GARUDA with others length on tracks without track 13 (Northern Lights Re-Lit (Continuous Mix))

Release history

References

 https://itunes.apple.com/gb/album/northern-lights/id394908497
 https://itunes.apple.com/gb/album/northern-lights/id401853262
 https://itunes.apple.com/gb/album/northern-lights-re-lit/id431055280
 http://www.discogs.com/Gareth-Emery-Northern-Lights-Re-Lit/release/2778148
 http://www.discogs.com/Gareth-Emery-Northern-Lights-Re-Lit/release/2782841
 http://www.discogs.com/Gareth-Emery-Northern-Lights-Re-Lit/release/2912499

Gareth Emery albums
2010 debut albums